Telephones - main lines in use:
2.888 million (2006) 

Telephones - mobile cellular:
13.075 million (2007)

Telephone system:
domestic:
86% of exchanges now digital; existing copper subscriber systems now being improved with Asymmetric Digital Subscriber Line (ADSL) equipment to accommodate Internet and other digital signals; trunk systems include fibre-optic cable and microwave radio relay 
Indian Ocean regions), 1 Intelsat, 1 Eutelsat, 1 Inmarsat, 1 Globalstar 

Radio broadcast stations:
AM 31, FM 304, shortwave 17 (2000) 

Radios:
3,159,134 (December 2000) 

Television broadcast stations:
150 (plus 1,434 repeaters) (2000) 

Televisions:
3,405,834 (December 2000) 

Internet Service Providers (ISPs):
more than 300 (2000) 

Internet users:
4.4 million (2007) 

Country code: CZ

See also : Czech Republic